The 2014–15 Israeli Women's Cup (Gvia HaMedina Nashim) was the 17th season of Israel's women's nationwide football cup competition. The competition began on 14 December 2014 with 6 first round matches.

At the final, played on 13 May 2015, Maccabi Kishronot Hadera had beaten ASA Tel Aviv University 1–0 in extra time, with a single goal by striker Shirley Ohana, scored at the 97th minute.

Results

First round

Quarter-finals
As seven clubs progressed to this round, Maccabi Be'er Sheva received a bye into the semi-finals.

Semi-finals

Final

References

External links
2014–15 State Cup Women Israeli Football Association 

Israel Women's Cup seasons
cup
Israel